Remains is a solo album by soprano saxophonist Steve Lacy, which was recorded in Switzerland in 1991 and first released on the hat ART label the following year.

Reception

The Allmusic review by Scott Yanow stated "On this solo soprano saxophone CD, the remarkable Steve Lacy performs his six-song, half-hour "Time of Tao-Cycle," plus three other originals ... The improvising is thoughtful, adventurous, and sometimes wandering, but rarely aimless. For specialized tastes".

Track listing
All compositions by Steve Lacy except where noted
 "Existence" – 5:25
 "The Way" – 6:46
 "Bone" – 4:14
 "Name" – 6:34
 "The Breath" – 4:57
 "Life on Its Way" – 2:49
 "Pearl Street" – 5:15
 "Remains" – 18:05
 "Afterglow" – 6:11
 "Epistrophy" (Thelonious Monk, Kenny Clarke) – 3:59

Personnel
Steve Lacy – soprano saxophone

References

Steve Lacy (saxophonist) albums
1992 albums
Hathut Records albums